Stadio San Filippo - Franco Scoglio (Saint Philip Stadium) is a football stadium in Messina, Italy.  It is currently the home of A.C.R. Messina.

History
The stadium was initially commissioned at the start of the 1990s, but was not finished until 2004. It was officially opened on August 17, 2004 with Messina playing host to Juventus in a match they lost 1–0. The first official match was a week later, on August 22, the Coppa Italia match Messina–Acireale (4–0). It replaced the old 11,900 seat Stadio Comunale Giovanni Celeste, which is currently the home ground of the new club of S.S.D. Città di Messina.

Structure
The total area is 114,640 sm, of which 44,300 sm reserved to car parking and 70,340 sm to a service building close to the stadium. There is no athletic track around the field, and the visibility is very good in each sector. There is a total absence of a covered seating section anywhere in the stadium, however an agreement between the team owners and the municipality aims to rectify the problem in the near future.

Trivia
The stadium name is derived from the neighborhood of Messina where it was built, but a couple of petitions hope to rename it either after the former Messina manager Franco Scoglio (1941–2005) or the Messina native, Saint Annibale Maria di Francia (1851–1927).

Milestone matches

National team matches

References

San Filippo
San
Buildings and structures in Messina
Sports venues in Sicily
2004 establishments in Italy